Homely Meals is a 2014 Indian Malayalam-language comedy drama film written by Vipin Atley and directed by Anoop Kannan (who previously directed Jawan of Vellimala), starring Vipin Atley, Rajesh Sharma, Neeraj Madhav and Srinda Ashab. The film received positive reviews upon release. It was appreciated for its novel theme, directorial value and technical expertise.

Plot

Homely Meals is about the journey of Alan, an odd looking youngster who is crazy about films and wants to make a mark in the visual media with aid from his rowdy friends. However, his dream is stumbled upon by his former friend Sajith and Sharath Chandran, Sajith's mentor, who had previously helped Sajith steal credit for Alan's show.

Cast

 Vipin Atley as Alan
 Srinda Ashab as Nanditha
 Rajesh Sharma as Palarivattam Mosappan
 Neeraj Madhav as Arun
 Shreerej as Praveen
 Thommy as Dicrooze
 Jain Paul as Sree Sankar
 Basil Joseph as Pottan Basil
 Sharafudheen as Chandrappan, Dubbing Engineer 
 Manoj K. Jayan as Sarath Chandran
 Nedumudi Venu as Father Dickson
 Kailash as Sajith Ram
 Sabitha Anand as Alan's mother
 Sreelatha Namboothiri as Alan's grandmother
 Babu Antony as himself
 Sunil Sukhada as Parameswaran Nair
 Sudheer Karamana as Surendran, Arun's father
 Sasi Kalinga as Chacko Chettan
 Sreejith Ravi as Sajan, Bike passenger
 Anil Murali as CI Karthikeyan
 Joju George as Raghavan, Program Director
 Shivaji Guruvayoor as Roy Peter
 Vaishak Uthaman as a man in BAR
 Dinesh Prabhakar as Tony
Moly Kannamaly as Mary 
Anwar Shereef as Bacchu
Majeed as Bishop Mar Basselius Cornelius
Gourav Menon as Sanju, Arun's brother
Malini Sivaraman as girl in the cycle
Balaji Sharma as Camera man

Reception
The film received positive reviews upon release. It was appreciated for its novel theme, directorial value and technical expertise.  Paresh C Palicha of Rediff.com rated the film  and wrote, "Homely Meals is watchable for its earnest performances." Deepa Soman of The Times of India gave a  rating and said, "It's through comedy that the film scores most of its brownie points. The actors, many of them new, have gotten under the skin of their characters. Overall, the film does not disappoint and definitely is a one-time watch."

References

External links
 

2010s Malayalam-language films